GroundUp may refer to the following:

 GroundUp (news agency) - South African non-profit online news agency.
 GroundUP (album) - 2012 music album by the American jazz band Snarky Puppy
 GroundUPmusic - a label started by Snarky Puppy